The 1959 Australian Drivers Championship was a CAMS sanctioned motor racing title for drivers of Formula Libre cars. The championship winner was awarded the 1959 CAMS Gold Star.

The series was won by Victorian racer Len Lukey driving his Cooper T45 Climax and in the opening round of the series his own much modified Cooper T23 which was known as the Lukey-Bristol. Lukey was one of only a few drivers who attempted to complete the gruelling twelve race schedule, the longest in ADC history. Lukey finished just two points ahead of his season long rival, Alec Mildren from the ACT (Cooper-Climax). Stan Jones was third in the championship, using four different cars over the course of the series. Race victories were shared around with Mildren taking three wins. Lukey, Jones and Bill Patterson each took two wins, with single victories going to Jack Brabham, Bib Stillwell and New Zealand Maserati 250F racer Ross Jensen.

Calendar
The title, which was the third Australian Drivers' Championship, was contested over a twelve race series.

Winning driver not awarded points for races 1 and 5

Points
Championship points were awarded on a 12-7-5-3-2-1 basis to the first six Australian drivers at each race, irrespective of actual race placings gained. Only the best nine race results could be retained by each driver.

As only Australian resident drivers were eligible, South Pacific Championship winner Jack Brabham and Bathurst 100 winner Ross Jensen were not awarded points towards the championship.

Results

References

Further reading
 Australian Motor Sport Review, 1958–59, pages 83–95
 The official 50-race history of the Australian Grand Prix, 1986

External links
 Open wheelers 1959, www.autopics.com.au

Australian Drivers' Championship
Drivers' Championship